Scott G. Lloyd (born December 19, 1952) is a retired American professional basketball player. He was a 6'10" 230 lb center who played high school basketball at East Phoenix High School where he was selected All-America and led his team to the 1971 state title. After receiving hundreds of college scholarship offers, Lloyd elected to play at the local Arizona State University.

In 1975, together with Lionel "Train" Hollins, Lloyd led the Sun Devils to the Western Athletic Conference title and he earned honorable mention All-America. During four years at ASU, Lloyd averaged 13.1 points and 6.7 rebounds per game, and was named team MVP after the 1975–76 season.

Professional career
Lloyd was selected in the second round in the 1976 NBA draft (24th pick overall) by the Milwaukee Bucks. The next summer he was named MVP of the Summer Pro League after averaging 23.4 points and 8.2 rebounds.

Lloyd played the next season for the Buffalo Braves, who became the San Diego Clippers after the 1977–78 season. After being traded to the Chicago Bulls as a back-up for Artis Gilmore, Lloyd then played one season of pro ball in Venice, Italy.

Lloyd's big break came in 1980 when he was signed by the expansion Dallas Mavericks. He played three seasons with the Mavs, starting 87 consecutive games at center. He scored a career-high 28 points against the Portland Trail Blazers.  As a center, Lloyd had a surprisingly strong outside shot, and in the 1981–82 season he led the Mavericks with a three-point field goal percentage of .500.

Throughout his career, Lloyd became endeared to local fans for his work ethic, modesty, outgoing personality and devotion to charity causes.

Lloyd was the subject of a spirited Scott Lloyd Fan Club that operated from 1977-83. The club became famous for hanging 50-foot banners from the balconies of arenas around the NBA, with slogans like "Great Scott - It's Lloyd!," "This is the Year of Our Lloyd," "Llong Llive Lloyd," and "May the Lloyd be with you." The fan club was featured in Sports Illustrated magazine (March 26, 1983) .

NBA career statistics

Regular season

|-
| align="left" | 1976–77
| align="left" | Milwaukee
| 69 || - || 14.9 || .472 || - || .754 || 3.0 || 0.5 || 0.3 || 0.2 || 5.8
|-
| align="left" | 1977–78
| align="left" | Milwaukee
| 14 || - || 8.0 || .364 || - || .600 || 1.9 || 0.6 || 0.2 || 0.4 || 2.1
|-
| align="left" | 1977–78
| align="left" | Buffalo
| 56 || - || 10.1 || .425 || - || .741 || 2.1 || 0.6 || 0.2 || 0.2 || 3.2
|-
| align="left" | 1978–79
| align="left" | San Diego
| 5 || - || 6.2 || .000 || - || .000 || 0.6 || 0.0 || 0.2 || 0.0 || 0.0
|-
| align="left" | 1978–79
| align="left" | Chicago
| 67 || - || 6.9 || .350 || - || .574 || 1.4 || 0.5 || 0.1 || 0.1 || 1.7
|-
| align="left" | 1980–81
| align="left" | Dallas
| 72 || - || 30.4 || .448 || .000 || .717 || 6.3 || 2.2 || 0.5 || 0.3 || 8.8
|-
| align="left" | 1981–82
| align="left" | Dallas
| 74 || 17 || 14.1 || .379 || .500 || .758 || 2.2 || 0.9 || 0.2 || 0.1 || 3.9
|-
| align="left" | 1982–83
| align="left" | Dallas
| 15 || 0 || 13.7 || .380 || .000 || .647 || 3.1 || 1.4 || 0.4 || 0.4 || 3.3
|- class="sortbottom"
| style="text-align:center;" colspan="2"| Career
| 372 || 17 || 15.2 || .425 || .286 || .718 || 3.0 || 1.0 || 0.3 || 0.2 || 4.6
|}

Business career
Lloyd retired after the 1982–83 season, and now owns Hamhula Tee Shirt Co., a custom silk screening T-shirt printing business in Dallas, Texas.

Lloyd's T-shirt business also graciously makes shirts for National Adoption Day in Dallas, Texas.

Personal
In 2004, Lloyd suffered a ruptured aorta. Doctors at Presbyterian Hospital in Dallas performed emergency surgery to replace the torn aorta with a titanium and polyester valve.

Notes

External links

1952 births
Living people
American men's basketball players
Arizona State Sun Devils men's basketball players
Buffalo Braves players
Centers (basketball)
Chicago Bulls players
Dallas Mavericks players
Milwaukee Bucks draft picks
Milwaukee Bucks players
San Diego Clippers players
Basketball players from Chicago